The men's shot put at the 2014 European Athletics Championships took place at the Letzigrund on 12 August.

Medalists

Records

Schedule

+

Results

Qualification

20.10 m (Q) or at least 12 best performers (q) advanced to the Final.

Final

References

Qualification Results
Final Results

Shot Put M
Shot put at the European Athletics Championships